Iolaus alienus, the brown-line sapphire, is a butterfly of the family Lycaenidae. It is found in most of Sub-Saharan Africa.

The wingspan is 33–37 mm for males and 35–40 mm for females. Adults are on wing from August to November (with a peak in September) and sometimes again from April to May in South Africa. There are two generations per year.

Larvae have been reported on Loranthus species. The larvae of subspecies I. a. alienus feed on Tapinanthus brunneus, Tapinanthus subulatus, Oliverella rubroviridis and Helixanthera kirkii.

Subspecies
Iolaus alienus alienus (from KwaZulu-Natal and Transvaal to Mozambique, Zimbabwe, Zambia, Malawi, southern Tanzania)
Iolaus alienus bicaudatus Aurivillius, 1905 (northern Cameroon, northern Nigeria, Upper Volta)
Iolaus alienus ugandae Stempffer, 1953 (Kenya, Uganda, southern Sudan)
Iolaus alienus sophiae Henning & Henning, 1991

References

External links

Images representing Iolaus alienus at Barcodes of Life
Die Gross-Schmetterlinge der Erde 13: Die Afrikanischen Tagfalter. Plate XIII 69 b and c as bicaudatus Aurivillius, 1905 (synonym).

Butterflies described in 1898
Iolaus (butterfly)
Butterflies of Africa
Taxa named by Roland Trimen